Pontus Silfwer (born 14 August 1991) is a Swedish footballer who plays for Sundsvall.

He played youth football for Alnö, Sundsvall. In 2010 he was drafted into the senior squad. In 2017 he signed for Norwegian club Mjøndalen, later in 2017 Silfwer signed for Halmstad on a -year contract.

Silfwer went back to Mjøndalen in 2019.

Career statistics

Club

References

1991 births
Living people
People from Sundsvall
Swedish footballers
Association football defenders
Allsvenskan players
Superettan players
Mjøndalen IF players
Norwegian First Division players
Eliteserien players
Swedish expatriate footballers
Expatriate footballers in Norway
Swedish expatriate sportspeople in Norway
Sportspeople from Västernorrland County